Ahmed Arab (19 March 1933 – 1 March 2023) was an Algerian footballer who played as a defender. He competed in the men's tournament at the 1960 Summer Olympics representing France. He later represented Algeria between 1963 and 1964.

References

External links
 

1933 births
2023 deaths
People from Chlef
French footballers
Algerian footballers
Association football defenders
Dual internationalists (football)
Algeria international footballers
France international footballers
Olympic footballers of France
Footballers at the 1960 Summer Olympics
CR Belouizdad players
Limoges FC players
21st-century Algerian people